Smokin' is an album by organist Charlie Earland which was recorded in 1969 and 1977 and released on the Muse label. The album contains two new recordings and reissues three tracks from Earland's 1969 album Soul Crib.

Reception

The AllMusic review by Ron Wynn stated "Fine mid-'70s sextet set featuring Earland's customary soul-jazz, blues, and funk, with uptempo and ballad originals".

Track listing
 "Penn Relays" (Charles Earland) – 6:00
 "Danny Boy's Soul" (Dave Paul) – 3:50
 "Milestones #2" (Miles Davis) – 8:50
 "Soon It's Gonna Rain" (Harvey Schmidt, Tom Jones) – 9:30
 "Strangers in the Night" (Bert Kaempfert, Charles Singleton, Eddie Snyder) – 5:30

Personnel
Charles Earland – organ
George Coleman, Dave Schnitter (track 1) – tenor saxophone
Jimmy Ponder – guitar
Walter Perkins (tracks 3–5), Bobby Durham (tracks 1 & 2)  – drums 
Herb Fisher – percussion (track 1)

References

Muse Records albums
Charles Earland albums
1977 albums
Albums produced by Ozzie Cadena
Albums recorded at Van Gelder Studio